Massimo Lopez (born 11 January 1952) is an Italian actor, voice actor, comedian, impressionist and television personality.

Together with fellow actors Anna Marchesini and Tullio Solenghi, he has been a member of the comic group known as Il Trio (The Trio).

Biography
Lopez was born to parents from Naples who were temporarily working in Ascoli Piceno. He started his acting career in 1975 and founded Il Trio in 1982 with Tullio Solenghi and Anna Marchesini: the Trio debuts on Rai Radio 2 with the Hellzapoppin radio show.

Following the great success of Hellzapoppin, the Trio participated in various television programs like Domenica in and the 1986 edition of Fantastico and took part to the Sanremo Music Festival editions of 1986, 1987 and 1989.

In 1990, the Trio reaches the peak of success with the parody of Alessandro Manzoni's The Betrothed, which was broadcast on Rai 1 in 5 episodes. Together with Solenghi and Marchesini, Lopez brought on stage two theatrical shows: Allacciare le cinture di sicurezza (Fasten your seat belts) in 1987 and In principio era il trio (In the Beginning, there was the Trio) in 1990.

The Trio dissolved in 1994, due to the will of all three actors to work as soloists, but reunited for one last time in 2008 to celebrate its 25th anniversary with the TV-program Non esiste più la mezza stagione.

In 2005, Lopez hosted together with Solenghi Striscia la notizia.

As a voice actor, Lopez is known for dubbing voices. He has been providing the current Italian voice of Homer Simpson in The Simpsons since the death of Tonino Accolla in 2013. He has also dubbed some famous actors, including Stephen Fry in The Hobbit film franchise as well as Mike Myers in the second installment of the Austin Powers movies and Robin Williams in the live action adaption of Popeye. In his animated roles, Lopez has performed the Italian voice of Chilly McStuffins since the second season of Doc McStuffins as well as Grand Pabbie in Frozen, Ramon in Happy Feet, Mr. Peabody in Mr. Peabody & Sherman and Lionheart in Zootopia.

On 27 March 2017 Lopez suffered a heart attack while he was performing on stage; he quickly underwent an angioplasty and was transferred to a cardiological rehabilitation center, where he recovered completely and came back on stage two months later.

Personal life
Lopez is the younger brother of the late voice actor Giorgio Lopez, who was the official Italian dubbing artist for Danny DeVito. He is also the uncle of voice actors Gabriele and Andrea Lopez.

Filmography

Cinema
 Odd Squad (1981)
 Aida of the Trees (2001) - Voice

Television

With the Trio
 Domenica in (1985–1986)
 Fantastico (1986–1987)
 Sanremo Music Festival 1986 (1986)
 Sanremo Music Festival 1987 (1987)
 Sanremo Music Festival 1989 (1989)
 Non esiste più la mezza stagione (2008)

As soloist
 Scherzi a parte (1995, 1997)
 Quelli che... il Calcio (2001–2002)
 Striscia la notizia (2005)
 Miss Italia Show (2018)

Dubbing roles

Animation
Homer Simpson in The Simpsons (season 24+)
Chilly McStuffins in Doc McStuffins (season 2+)
Ramon in Happy Feet
Ramon in Happy Feet 2
Grand Pabbie in Frozen
Grand Pabbie in Frozen II
Mayor Leodore Lionheart in Zootopia
Mr. Peabody in Mr. Peabody & Sherman 
Captain Qwark in Ratchet & Clank
Eduardo in Rio 2
Papa Smurf in Smurfs: The Lost Village
Archibald Snatcher in The Boxtrolls
Horse in A Town Called Panic
Cowardly Lion in Legends of Oz: Dorothy's Return
Bobby in Turbo
Bruno Bullnerd in ChalkZone

Live action
Latin Lover Narrator in Jane the Virgin
Master of Lake-town in The Hobbit: The Desolation of Smaug
Master of Lake-town in The Hobbit: The Battle of the Five Armies
Mr. Johnson in Love & Friendship
Popeye in Popeye
George Falconer in A Single Man
Lee Chen-chiang in Game of Death II
Zanik Hightopp in Alice Through the Looking Glass
Tommy Brue in A Most Wanted Man
Austin Powers / Dr. Evil / Fat Bastard in Austin Powers: The Spy Who Shagged Me
Fernando Cienfuegos in Mamma Mia! Here We Go Again
Chuck Lumley in Night Shift
Papa Rudy in The Walk
Method acting teacher in The Disaster Artist
Ghost in 22 Jump Street
Stephen Hawking in The Big Bang Theory
Mr. Bennet in Pride and Prejudice and Zombies
Aamir Barkawi in London Has Fallen
Splinter in Teenage Mutant Ninja Turtles
Splinter in Teenage Mutant Ninja Turtles: Out of the Shadows

Video games
 Homer Simpson in Lego Dimensions

References

External links

 
 
 
 
 

1952 births
Living people
Italian impressionists (entertainers)
Italian male comedians
Italian male film actors
Italian male stage actors
Italian male television actors
Italian male video game actors
Italian male voice actors
Italian people of Spanish descent
Italian television personalities
People from Ascoli Piceno
20th-century Italian male actors
21st-century Italian male actors
20th-century Italian comedians
21st-century Italian comedians
Ciak d'oro winners